Ignacio Esparza Nach (born 21 May 1994) is a Mexican professional boxer.

Professional career
In September 2014, Ignacio upset an undefeated Damian Norris to win the WBA Fedebol cruiserweight Championship.

On 27 June 2019 he lost a twelve-round decision to IBF Inter-Continental champion Enad Licina; this bout was televised on a Showtime boxing card.

On October 23, 2020 Esparza beat the veteran Javier Polanco at the Explanada "El Grullo" in El Grullo, Jalisco, Mexico.

Professional boxing record

|-
| style="text-align:center;" colspan="8"|17 Wins (13 knockouts, 4 decisions), 3 Losses (2 knockout, 1 decision)
|-  style="text-align:center; background:#e3e3e3;"
|  style="border-style:none none solid solid; "|Result
|  style="border-style:none none solid solid; "|Record
|  style="border-style:none none solid solid; "|Opponent
|  style="border-style:none none solid solid; "|Type
|  style="border-style:none none solid solid; "|Round
|  style="border-style:none none solid solid; "|Date
|  style="border-style:none none solid solid; "|Location
|  style="border-style:none none solid solid; "|Notes
|- align=center
|Loss
|align=left|
|align=left| Simon Kean
|align=left|KO
|align=left|5
|07/04/2018
|align=left|
|align=left|
|-
|Win
|
|align=left| Owen Beck
|MD
|10
|29/10/2016
|align=left| Coliseo Olimpico de la UG, Guadalajara
|align=left|
|-
|Win
|
|align=left| Miguel Angel Flores
|KO
|1
|27/06/2015
|align=left| Coliseo Olimpico de la UG, Guadalajara
|
|-
|Win
|
|align=left| Denis Reyes
|UD
|8
|23/10/2013
|align=left| Salón de Usos Múltiples, El Grullo
|
|-
|Win
|
|align=left| Antonio Duarte
|UD
|8
|25/05/2013
|align=left| Auditorio Municipal, Tapalpa
|
|-
|Win
|
|align=left| Javier Polanco
|KO
|1
|23/10/2010
|align=left| El Grullo Esplanade, El Grullo, Jalisco
|align=left|
|-
|Loss
|
|align=left| Denis Lebedev
|KO
|4
|22/02/2010
|align=left| Udmurtia Circus, Izhevsk
|align=left|
|-
|Win
|
|align=left| Victor Palacios
|TKO
|1
|20/11/2009
|align=left| Arena Coliseo, Guadalajara, Jalisco
|align=left|
|-
|Loss
|
|align=left| Enad Licina
|UD
|12
|27/06/2009
|align=left| Max-Schmeling-Halle, Prenzlauer Berg, Berlin
|align=left|
|-
|Win
|
|align=left| Ricardo Arce
|KO
|1
|05/12/2008
|align=left| Arena Jalisco, Guadalajara, Jalisco
|align=left|
|-
|Win
|
|align=left| Miguel Gutierrez
|UD
|8
|23/11/2007
|align=left| Estadio Jalisco, Guadalajara, Jalisco
|align=left|
|-
|Win
|
|align=left| Oscar Avila
|KO
|2
|02/02/2007
|align=left| Arena Jalisco, Guadalajara, Jalisco
|align=left|
|-
|Win
|
|align=left| Ricardo Arce
|UD
|6
|17/06/2006
|align=left| Auditorio Fausto Gutierrez Moreno, Tijuana, Baja California
|align=left|
|-
|Win
|
|align=left| Eduardo "Guina" Ayala
|UD
|10
|25/03/2006
|align=left| El Domo del Code Jalisco, Guadalajara, Jalisco
|align=left|
|-
|Win
|
|align=left| Mario Maciel
|TKO
|5
|24/02/2006
|align=left| Arena Coliseo, Guadalajara, Jalisco
|align=left|
|-
|Win
|
|align=left| Jose Concepcion
|TKO
|1
|02/12/2005
|align=left| Guadalajara, Jalisco
|align=left|
|-
|Win
|
|align=left| Juan Carlos Martinez
|KO
|1
|17/06/2005
|align=left| Arena Coliseo, Guadalajara, Jalisco
|align=left|
|-
|Win
|
|align=left| Damian Norris
|DQ
|7
|24/09/2004
|align=left| Arena Coliseo, Guadalajara, Jalisco
|align=left|
|-
|Win
|
|align=left| Mario Maciel
|KO
|5
|15/05/2004
|align=left| Arena Jalisco, Guadalajara, Jalisco
|align=left|
|-
|Win
|
|align=left| Miguel Carrillo Ruiz
|KO
|2
|13/03/2004
|align=left| Guadalajara, Jalisco
|align=left|
|-
|Win
|
|align=left|Jose Corrales
|KO
|3
|25/10/2003
|align=left| Arena Jalisco, Guadalajara, Jalisco
|align=left|
|-
|Win
|
|align=left| Jorge Arellano
|TKO
|5
|12/07/2003
|align=left| Arena Jalisco, Guadalajara, Jalisco
|align=left|
|-
|Win
|
|align=left| Hugo Lomeli
|KO
|5
|17/07/2000
|align=left|
|align=left|
|-
|Win
|
|align=left| Jesus Mena
|KO
|1
|02/06/2000
|align=left| Apatzingan, Michoacan de Ocampo
|align=left|
|}

References

External links

Sportspeople from Guadalajara, Jalisco
Boxers from Jalisco
Cruiserweight boxers
1977 births
Living people
Mexican male boxers